The General was an official in the Miskito Kingdom. The position appears to have been created in the early eighteenth century and was under the control of the Zambo segment of the kingdom. The General ruled the northern region from the Wanks River to nearly Trujillo.

List of Generals
Peter (1722–1729)
Charles Hobby (1729-c 1740)
Handyside (c 1740–1764)
Tempest (1764-c 1785)
Thomas Lee (1785–1790)
Perkin Tempest (1796–1797)
Edward Trelawney (1790-1790)
Jaspar Hall (1790–1797)
Lowry Robinson (1800-?)
Barras (1820)
Thomas Lowry Robinson (c 1830-c 1847)
Mettison (1847)

References

Miskito